The Firebird Hornet is a German single-place, paraglider that was designed and produced by Firebird Sky Sports AG of Füssen in the mid-2000s. It is now out of production.

Design and development
The Hornet was designed as an intermediate glider. The models are each named for their relative size.

Variants
Hornet S
Small-sized model for lighter pilots. The glider model is DHV 2GH certified.
Hornet M
Mid-sized model for medium-weight pilots. The glider model is DHV 2GH certified.
Hornet  L
Large-sized model for heavier pilots. The glider model is DHV 2GH certified.
Hornet Sport S
Small-sized model for lighter pilots. The glider model is DHV 2GH certified.
Hornet Sport M
Mid-sized model for medium-weight pilots. The glider model is DHV 2GH certified.
Hornet Sport L
Large-sized model for heavier pilots. The glider model is DHV 2GH certified.

Specifications (Hornet L)

References

External links

Hornet
Paragliders